The Asia Power Index is an index that measures resources and influence to rank the relative power of states in Indo-Pacific, published by the Lowy Institute annually from 2018. The Index ranks 26 countries and territories.

Methodology
The index evaluates international power in Asia through 128 indicators across eight thematic measures:
Eight thematic measures are as follows: (Percent in parentheses indicates weighting)

Resources
Economic capability (17.5%)
Military capability (17.5%)
Resilience (10%)
Future resources (10%)
Influence
Economic relationships (15%)
Defense networks (10%)
Diplomatic influence (10%)
Cultural influence (10%)

Rankings

References

Economy of Asia
Economic indicators
Diplomacy